The 2003/04 NTFL season was the 83rd season of the Northern Territory Football League (NTFL).

St Marys have won there 24th premiership title while defeating the Nightcliff Tigers in the grand final by 19 points.

Grand Final

References

Northern Territory Football League seasons
NTFL